King Xie may refer to:

Xie of Xia
King Xie of Zhou (died 750 BC)